The Ossetian Military Road was constructed between 1854 and 1889, by the Russian Empire in the Caucasus.

References 
“The Ossetian Military Road” in: The Columbia Encyclopedia, Sixth Edition, 2001-05: Columbia University Press.

Roads in Russia
Roads in Georgia (country)
Transport in North Ossetia–Alania
Roads in South Ossetia
Military roads